Paul Robert Ash (February 11, 1891, Germany — July 13, 1958, Manhattan, New York) was a German orchestra leader, composer, vaudeville personality, and recording artist, who emigrated to the United States.

He recorded several hit songs: "Rememb'ring" (Brunswick, 1924), with his Granada Orchestra, "My Pet" (Columbia, 1928) and "Shadows on the Swanee" (Columbia, 1933). He also penned Kay Kyser's theme "Thinking of You."

In 1928 he performed a three week engagement in New York City at the Paramount Theatre with a young Ginger Rogers as her career was beginning.

He was born in Germany but, at the age of one, moved to America.

References

External links
 
 Biography of Paul Ash, by James Lacy at www.findagrave.com
 Paul Ash recordings at the Discography of American Historical Recordings.

1891 births
1958 deaths
20th-century American male musicians
American male violinists
American lyricists
American bandleaders
German emigrants to the United States
Place of birth missing
20th-century American conductors (music)
20th-century American violinists
20th-century American pianists
Brunswick Records artists
Columbia Records artists
American male pianists